Glee: The Music, The Christmas Album, Volume 3 is the fourteenth soundtrack album by the cast of the American musical television series Glee. It features six songs from the fourth season and four bonus songs. It was released on December 11, 2012.

Commercial performance
The album debuted at number 20 on the US Billboard 200, and in its second week, the album fell to number 54, selling 25,000 copies.

Track listing

References

2012 Christmas albums
Pop Christmas albums
Glee (TV series) albums